St Matthew's Church, Ipswich is an Anglican church in Ipswich, Suffolk. The building is a Grade II* listed building of medieval origin.

St Matthew's Parish
In medieval Ipswich, St Matthew's Church was the parish church for St Matthew's Parish. This constituted part of West Ward, Ipswich, along with the parishes of St Mary-le-Tower and St Mary at the Elms.

St. Matthew’s Church was first recorded in the 12th century, but much of the work to create the present building was carried out in the 14th and 15th centuries. It was then enlarged in phases in the 19th century during its time as the garrison church for the Ipswich barracks.

The font dates from the sixteenth century and was paid for by the vicar of the time, John Bailey. It features eight panels.

References

Church of England church buildings in Ipswich